Esdaile  may refer to:

People:
Arundell Esdaile (1880–1956), British librarian, Secretary to the British Museum, 1926-40
James Esdaile (1808–1859), surgeon and mesmerist
James Esdaile (mayor) (1714–1793), Lord Mayor of London, 1777
James Esdaile (minister) (1775–1854), Scottish minister and writer
Katharine Esdaile (1881–1950), British art historian
Nicole Esdaile (born 1987), Australian goalball player
William Esdaile (1758–1837), English banker

Places:
Esdaile, Wisconsin

Other:
Esdaile state, an extreme procedure in hypnosis